Lia Andrea Aquino Ramos-Moss is a Filipino model, beauty pageant titleholder, and entrepreneur. She represented the Philippines in the Miss Universe 2006 pageant held in Los Angeles, California. Lia was also voted as Miss Photogenic that same year.  She is a political science graduate of the University of the Philippines.

She was previously a program officer for The Asia Foundation in Manila.  Currently, Ramos is the CEO of Glamourbox, a Philippines-based beauty and cosmetics retailer.

References

External links

Binibining Pilipinas winners
Miss Universe 2006 contestants
Living people
1981 births
People from Davao City